Man-O-War Cay is a small island in the Abaco region of the Bahamas. It had a population of 215 at the 2010 census.

History
When the American colonies were successful in defeating the British in the U.S. Revolutionary War, some British Loyalists fled the country, traveling to the closest Crown territory, The Bahamas.

Following the American Revolution, British Loyalists resettled to Man-O-War Cay. It is one of the early Loyalist settlements in The Abacos. Beginning in 1798, its residents started farming.

Early 19th century settlers Benjamin and Eleanor Albury account for 70% of the island's current Alburys.
On September 1, 2019, Hurricane Dorian made landfall on Man-O-War Cay in the Abaco Islands after 16:00 UTC with winds of 185 mph (295 km/h) and wind gusts up to 225 mph (360 km/h), tying Dorian with the 1935 Labor Day hurricane as the strongest landfalling Atlantic hurricane on record. There are reports of major damage throughout the islands which has been described as "catastrophic damage" and "pure hell." In the days following the storm, CNN reported that 90% to 100% of all buildings on Man-O-War Cay had sustained damage.

Geography
A section of island called "The Narrows" by visitors and "The Low Place" by locals is exceptionally narrow, with a beach on both sides separated by a roadway built into the rock formation between them, less than 10 metres across. The harbor side of the island faces Marsh Harbour, and a beach side runs the length of the opposite shore.

Wreckage of the first USS Adirondack, which ran aground in August 1862, is strewn on the reef just northeast of Man-O-War.

Governance
Man-O-War Cay is represented in Parliament by The MP (Member of Parliament) for the South Abaco constituency, Mr. James Albury.

Currently, Man-O-War's representatives on the Hope Town District Council, (which also includes two other neighboring Cays) are: Mr. Jeremy Sweeting and Mr. Arthur Elden. Mr. Jeremy Sweeting serves as the Chief Councillor for their District.

Economy
The island is notable for its boat building history. William H. Albury was renowned in the country for his boat building skills. He built his first schooner at the age of 14. Albury died in 1972, but the boat building on the Cay still lives on. The last big boat built by the William H. Albury Ship Yard was the Esperanto. The Esperanto was later renamed The William H. Albury in his honor. Today, boat building consists primarily of fiberglass boats, as opposed to wooden vessels.

A number of workers commute each day from Marsh Harbour. There are two small grocery stores, a marina, a boat yard, a few gift shops, a hardware and lumber store, two restaurants and a bakery. Golf-carts are rented by several companies (the narrow roads, often unpaved outside of the town centre, only permit the use of golf-carts or other small vehicles). No liquor is sold on the island. During the summer some local houses are rented by vacationing families.

The home builders of Man-O-War are known throughout the Bahamas for building homes that "are built like ships, but bolted to the land." All the rafters and structure are joined together in a manner similar to ship construction and resist hurricanes very well. Several of the local boat builders still make the occasional "Abaco Dinghy" in their native woods of Madeira mahogany and other Bahamian hardwoods. They are today considered works of art and sought after by those who appreciate fine old world wooden vessels.

Transport
Public travel to Man-O-War Cay is available via ferry from Marsh Harbour.

Community
Most of the residents are in some way or another related to the Albury family. The people are very conservative, and still hold deep affection and loyalty to the British Crown. The majority of the residents are avid church-goers. The island has four churches, one Non-denominational, one Pentecostal, one Methodist, and one Plymouth Brethren. The island has very little crime and is considered clean and well kept.

Sport
The diving, snorkeling and water sports around the island are available.

References

Further reading
Albury, Haziel L. Man-O-War, My Island Home: A History of an Outer Abaco Island, Christian Year Publishing., 1977. 
Rodriguez, Ruth, Out Island Portraits - Bahamas 1946-1956, Out Island Press, 1983.

External links
Photos of Man-O-War Cay
Man-O-War Heritage Trust
 Man-O-War Heritage Museum
A map of Man-O-War Cay
 The Abaco Guide

Islands of the Bahamas
Abaco Islands